Adèle Milloz (5 May 1996 – 12 August 2022) was a French ski mountaineer. She competed at the 2017 Winter Military World Games, winning a gold medal.

She was born in Bourg-Saint-Maurice, Savoie, France on 5 May 1996.

At the 2018 European Championships in Nicolosi, she won a gold medal in the sprint discipline. 

She retired from the sport in 2019, and began her studies to become a mountain guide.

Death 
Milloz died on 12 August 2022, at the age of 26, together with another mountaineer, in an accident on Mont Blanc, along the normal route on the  side.
Other people have died on the same slope previously.

References

External links 
 
 

1996 births
2022 deaths
French mountain climbers
Mountaineering deaths
Sport deaths in France
Sportspeople from Savoie
People from Bourg-Saint-Maurice